Hitomi Soga-Jenkins (Japanese: 曽我ひとみ Soga Hitomi, born May 17, 1959) is a Japanese woman who was abducted to North Korea together with her mother, Miyoshi Soga, from Sado Island, Japan, in 1978. In 1980, she married Charles Robert Jenkins, an American defector to North Korea, with whom she had two daughters. In 2002, she was allowed to return to Japan, followed two years later by her husband and children.

Abduction and life in North Korea 

Soga, a nurse, was returning home from shopping with her then 46-year-old mother, Miyoshi, when they were abducted from her hometown of Mano-cho, now part of the city of Sado, Niigata, on August 12, 1978, and taken to North Korea to train agents in Japanese customs and language. Her mother, Miyoshi, was later separated from her and has not been heard from since. The North Koreans gave Soga the Korean name Min Hye-gyeong. She met Jenkins in early July 1980, when he was asked to teach her English, and they married on August 8, 1980. They had two daughters, Mika and Brinda.

Repatriation 
Soga was one of a group of five Japanese abductees whom North Korea allowed to visit their homeland in September 2002. Though the trip was intended to be brief, she, like her four companions, never returned to North Korea. She and many Japanese called on North Korea to release family members who had been left behind. On July 9, 2004, Soga was reunited with her husband and two daughters in Jakarta, Indonesia, which had been chosen as a neutral venue to allay fears that Jenkins would be arrested. The family came to Japan on July 18, 2004.

Jenkins was court-martialed and incarcerated for "desertion" at a U.S. military installation in Japan for 26 days then released. According to media reports, the family settled in Soga's hometown of Mano, on Sado Island.

In October 2012, she reportedly pleaded with the North Korean government for the release of her mother and other abductees. Charles Robert Jenkins died in 2017; Soga remains in Sado with her children.

Film
Soga was played by Horikoshi Nori in a 2006 Japanese television film, Saikai: Yokota Megumi-san no Negai (Reunion: Megumi Yokota's Wish).

See also
Anocha Panjoi
List of kidnappings
North Korean abductions of Japanese

References

External links
  
  
  
 

1959 births
1970s missing person cases
Formerly missing people
Japanese expatriates in North Korea
Kidnapped Japanese people
Living people
Missing person cases in Japan
North Korean abductions of Japanese citizens
People from Sado, Niigata
People of Shōwa-period Japan